The 1937–38 Yugoslav Football Championship (Serbo-Croato-Slovenian: Državno prvenstvo 1937/38 / Државно првенство 1937/38) was the 15th season of Kingdom of Yugoslavia's premier football competition.  It was won by Croatian side HAŠK.

League table

Results

Winning squad
Champions:

HAŠK (Coach Zoltán Opata)
Ladislav Žmara
Ivica Golac
Konstantinović
Nikola Pajević
Ivica Gajer
Milivoj Fink
Nikola Duković
Ivica Medarić
Ratko Kacian
Ico Hitrec
Horvat
Svetozar Peričić
Kokić
Kocejić
Blažeković
Cindrić
Duh

Top scorers
Final goalscoring position, number of goals, player/players and club.
1 - 17 goals - August Lešnik (Građanski Zagreb)
2 - 16 goals - Ivan Hitrec (HAŠK)
3 - 14 goals - Aleksandar Petrović (Jugoslavija)

See also
Yugoslav Cup
Yugoslav League Championship
Football Association of Yugoslavia

References

External links
Yugoslavia Domestic Football Full Tables

Yugoslav Football Championship
Yugo
1937–38 in Yugoslav football